Vimala Venkatappa Gowda (1952 – 2017) was an Indian politician who was the Deputy Chairman of Karnataka Legislative Council from 17 January 2011 to 17 October 2014. She was one of the senior leaders of the Bharatiya Janata Party in Karnataka and served as a member of the Karnataka Legislative Council for 2 terms from 18 June 2006 until her death in 17 April 2017. She died on 17 April 2017  after suffering a heart attack.

References

1952 births
2017 deaths
Members of the Karnataka Legislative Council
Politicians from Bangalore
Bharatiya Janata Party politicians from Karnataka
21st-century Indian women politicians
21st-century Indian politicians
Women members of the Karnataka Legislative Assembly
Deputy Chairpersons of Karnataka Legislative Council